Notscheid is a locality in the municipality Sankt Katharinen in the district of Neuwied in Rhineland-Palatinate, Germany.

Geography
The village lies on the watershed between the valleys of the Rhine and the Wied in low Westerwald northeast of the center of Sankt Katharinen. North of the village is the district boundary to local Vettelschoß, west is the district boundary of the municipality of Linz am Rhein.

History
Notscheid probably dates back to the high medieval period of deforestation. The name appeared in numerous different versions, including Nodscheidt, Noschiedt, Noscheid, Noschet, Noschot, Noschit, Norscheid, and Noschoß. It is attributed to the location of Notscheid on a trunk road that was used in distress (German: Not) in case other roads were flooded.

Bürgermeisters of Notscheid:

References

Villages in Rhineland-Palatinate